The Secretary for District Administration, formerly known as Secretary for City and New Territories Administration, was a minister in the Government of Hong Kong in 1980s, which is responsible for local administrative issues.

In 1974, "District Commissioner, New Territories", responsible for coordinating New Territories issues, was renamed and promoted to Secretary for the New Territories, highlighting the importance of the position. 

New position was created in December 1981 to replace the Secretary for the New Territories. The Secretary for City and New Territories Administration took over the responsibilities of City and New Territories Administration, merger of District Office and City District Office. Duties related to policy of the City and New Territories Administration which were handled by Secretary for Home Affairs was also transferred to the new secretary.

In 1985, the Secretary for District Administration, rebranded in 1983, replaced the Secretary for Home Affairs and to oversee traditions and community affairs. In 1989, the position was again renamed as Secretary for Home Affairs, ending the history of the position.

During 1975 and 1978, "Secretary for Administration" existed which shared a similar name, but was responsible for the efficiency of the government instead of local affairs.

List of office holders

Secretary for the New Territories Administration, 1974–1981

Secretary for City and New Territories Administration, 1981–1983

Secretaries for District Administration, 1983–1989

References 

District